Eupatorium pilosum, common name rough boneset, is a rare North American species of plant in the family Asteraceae. It is native to the eastern and south-central United States, found in every coastal state from Massachusetts to Texas, and as far inland as Kentucky.

Eupatorium pilosum is a perennial herb sometimes over 100 cm (40 inches) tall, spreading by means of underground rhizomes. The plant produces large displays of large numbers of tiny flower heads, each with 5 white disc florets but no ray florets.

References

pilosum
Flora of the United States
Plants described in 1788